Wyłudy  (from 1938-45 Andreastal) is a village in the administrative district of Gmina Pozezdrze, within Węgorzewo County, Warmian-Masurian Voivodeship, in northern Poland.

References

Villages in Węgorzewo County